Byron Patricio Guamá de la Cruz (born 14 June 1985) is an Ecuadorian road bicycle racer, who currently competes for UCI Continental team . He competed at the 2012 Summer Olympics in the Men's road race.

Major results

2003
 5th Road race, Pan American Junior Road Championships
2004
 1st  Overall Vuelta al Ecuador
 5th Time trial, Pan American Under-23 Road Championships
2006
 6th Overall Vuelta a Guatemala
1st Stage 2
2007
 1st  Road race, National Road Championships
 1st Stage 10 Vuelta a Guatemala
 7th Overall Vuelta al Ecuador
1st Stage 5
2008
 1st  Overall Doble Sucre Potosí GP Cemento Fancesa
1st Stages 1 & 2
 1st  Overall Vuelta al Ecuador
1st Stages 1, 2, 5 & 9
 9th Overall Vuelta a Chihuahua
1st Stage 3
2009
 4th Overall Vuelta al Ecuador
1st Stages 1 & 2
 6th Overall Vuelta a Guatemala
1st Stages 4 & 8
2010
 1st  Overall Vuelta al Ecuador
1st  Points classification
1st Stages 1 & 4
 4th Overall Vuelta a Bolivia
2011
 Vuelta a Colombia
1st Stages 4 & 8
 9th Road race, Pan American Games
 10th Road race, Pan American Road Championships
2012
 1st Stage 8 Vuelta a Colombia
 1st Stage 2 Vuelta Mundo Maya
 3rd Overall Tour do Rio
2013
 Vuelta a Colombia
1st Stages 2 & 10
 4th Road race, Pan American Road Championships
 4th Overall Vuelta a Guatemala
2014
 1st  Road race, Pan American Road Championships
 National Road Championships
1st  Road race
2nd Time trial
 6th Overall Volta ao Alentejo
1st  Mountains classification
1st Stage 1
2015
 1st  Road race, Pan American Road Championships
 1st  Overall Volta Ciclística Internacional do Rio Grande do Sul
1st Stages 3 & 4
 1st Stage 5 Vuelta a Venezuela
 1st  Mountains classification Volta ao Alentejo
 7th Road race, Pan American Games
 8th Overall Vuelta Mexico Telmex
1st Stage 5
2016
 1st Stage 8 Vuelta a Venezuela
 5th Overall Vuelta a Guatemala
1st Stage 7
 9th Overall Volta Ciclística Internacional do Rio Grande do Sul
1st Stage 3
2017
 3rd Road race, National Road Championships
 6th Overall Vuelta a la Independencia Nacional
 7th Overall Vuelta a Guatemala
1st Stages 7 & 8
2018
 1st Stage 9 Vuelta a Venezuela
 4th Road race, South American Games
2019
 4th Time trial, National Road Championships
 5th Overall Vuelta Ciclista a Costa Rica
1st  Points classification
1st Stage 1
 6th Road race, Pan American Road Championships
2020
 3rd Overall Vuelta a Guatemala
1st  Points classification
1st  Mountains classification
 8th Overall Vuelta al Ecuador
1st Stages 2, 3 & 5
2021
 2nd Road race, National Road Championships
 3rd Overall Vuelta al Ecuador

References

External links

1985 births
Living people
People from Espejo Canton
Ecuadorian male cyclists
Olympic cyclists of Ecuador
Cyclists at the 2012 Summer Olympics
Cyclists at the 2016 Summer Olympics
Cyclists at the 2011 Pan American Games
Cyclists at the 2015 Pan American Games
Cyclists at the 2019 Pan American Games
South American Games bronze medalists for Ecuador
South American Games medalists in cycling
Competitors at the 2010 South American Games
Pan American Games competitors for Ecuador